Three for Happiness (a.k.a. Three's Happiness) is a 1985 Croatian romantic drama film directed by Rajko Grlić.

Plot
A man (Miki Manojlović) is forced by poverty and desperation to use a children's plastic gun to rob a small bank and gets captured. Three years later, he is released from prison. He starts a romantic relationship with Zdenka, a factory worker, but still has strong feelings for his ex-wife Nina, who is now a mistress of Ivan, a well-to-do man. At the same time, Zdenka remains the love interest of Jozo, the factory doorkeeper...

Cast

 Miki Manojlović as Drago
 Mira Furlan as Zdenka Robić
 Bogdan Diklić as Jozo
 Vanja Drach as Ivan
 Dušan Jovanović as Željezničar
 Miodrag Krivokapić as Montenegrin Ticket Buyer
 Dubravka Ostojić as Nina Korbar
 Ksenija Pajić as Jagoda ("Strawberry")
 Mladen Budiščak as Pilar ("Sawyer")
 Nina Erak-Svrtan as Shoe Factory Shift Leader
 Drago Krča as Judge
 Vitomira Lončar as Telephone Operator
 Lana Golob as Shoe Factory Worker 
 Mladen Crnobrnja as Krojač ("Tailor")
 Jadranka Matković as Shoe Factory Worker
 Damir Saban as Shoe Factory Worker		
 Ljudevit Galić as Train Ticket Agent

Reception
The film won the FIPRESCI, Grand Prix and the Peter Karsten award for 'Best Script' by the International Federation of Film Critics for Rajko Grlić at the 1986 Valencia Festival of Mediterranean Cinema. It also won the Grand Prix at the Salso Film Festival in Italy, and many awards from Yugoslavian film festivals, including the Golden Arena for Scenography at the 1986 Pula Film Festival. The film was distributed in 14 countries.

Croatian film historian Ivo Škrabalo compared Three for Happiness unfavorably to Grlić's earlier works, noting more simplistic direction and failure to fulfill the genre's determinants. Škrabalo also remarked that the film steers clear of a more pronounced social criticism, limiting itself to showing contrast between social backgrounds.

Eleanor Mannikka of All Movie Guide wrote that the film "is an amusing and enjoyable romantic comedy buoyed by witty dialogue."

References

External links

1985 films
Croatian romantic drama films
1980s Croatian-language films
Yugoslav romantic drama films
Films directed by Rajko Grlić
Jadran Film films